Ciril Klinar (born 9 May 1937) is a Slovenian ice hockey player. He competed in the men's tournament at the 1968 Winter Olympics.

References

1937 births
Living people
Slovenian ice hockey left wingers
Olympic ice hockey players of Yugoslavia
Ice hockey players at the 1968 Winter Olympics
Sportspeople from Jesenice, Jesenice
HK Acroni Jesenice players
Yugoslav ice hockey left wingers